Maria Rønning (1741–1807), was a Norwegian-Faroese Weaver. She was born to Norwegian farmers Hans Gunnarsson Rønning and Anne Håvardsdatter, from 1768 married to Johan Christian Djurhuus, and the mother of the writer Jens Christian Djurhuus. She lived on the Faroe Islands after her marriage in 1768, where she was a well-known figure in folk lore. Her foremost achievement was her introduction of a new type of Loom, which made the important art of weaving easier and more developed on the islands.

References
 Hanus Kamban: J.H.O. Djurhuus: En litterær biografi. Odense Universitetsforlag, 2001 -  (Band I, S. 21 ff.)

1741 births
1807 deaths
18th-century Faroese people
Norwegian weavers
18th-century women textile artists
18th-century textile artists
19th-century women textile artists
19th-century textile artists